The Jatiya Rakkhi Bahini was a Bangladeshi para-military force formed in 1972 by the Sheikh Mujibur Rahman government.

Initially formed to curb the insurgency and maintain law and order the force became involved in numerous charges of human rights abuse including political killings, shooting by death squads, and rape. It was seen as the armed wing of the ruling Awami League and it swore an oath of loyalty to Sheikh Mujibur Rahman.

The Rakkhi Bahini has been condemned by many academics and journalists, including Ghulam Murshid who compared it with the Gestapo, and Anthony Mascarenhas who said that it was a "gang of hoodlums little different from the Nazi Brown shirts." Human Rights Watch states that the institutionalized violence committed by the Jatiya Rakkhi Bahini, established the culture of impunity with which security forces in independent Bangladesh continue to abuse human rights. Pro Awami League commentators dismiss the charges as "myths".

History 

After the end of the Bangladesh Liberation War, there was a violent insurgency to replace the elected revolutionary government of the newly independent country with a Marxist communist system of government inspired by Soviet Union and Chinese Communist Party through the uses of private militias formed by left wing army commanders who fought in the war like Colonel Abu Taher and political activists many of whom were members of Jatiya Samajtantrik Dal.

During the Liberation War of Bangladesh, numerous civilians joined the war after being trained by the Indian forces. Tajuddin Ahmed felt these people should come under national service as they had arms and training. Tajuddin Ahmed asked Sheikh Mujibur Rahman to form a para-military force for them.

Sheikh Mujibur Rahman primarily rejected the proposal but soon realized the necessity of an elite force, because many police officers died in the Bangladesh Liberation War. Whenever rebels attacked them in their office, they were outnumbered. Raw materials, machinery and goods of factories were being smuggled through the border to India which also became a headache for the newly formed government. Considering this situation, Sheikh Mujibur Rahman decided to form this force.

Time remarked after independence that "Many of the more radical young guerrillas who fought with the Mukti Bahini  may not be content with the moderate course charted by the middle-aged politicians of the Awami League. Moreover, the present Dacca government is a very remote power in country villages where the local cadres of the Mukti Bahini are highly visible." The article also quoted one of its commanders, Ali Ashraf Chowdhury: "We will never lay down our arms until our social ideals have been realized". he said. The article continues, "So far the Mujib Bahini has done a commendable job of protecting the Biharis, the non-Bengali Moslems who earned Bengali wrath by siding with the Pakistani army. But the government is anxious to disarm the Mujib Bahini, and has plans to organize it into a constabulary that would carry out both police and militia duties."

Masudul Haque in his book Bangladesher Swadhinota Juddho O CIA (Liberation War of Bangladesh and CIA), mentions Abdur Rajjak, a young leader and the chief of Bangladesh Swecchasebok League (Bangladesh Volunteer's League) that Mujib told them not to surrender all the guns.
Jatiya Rakkhi Bahini was actively deployed just after the Indian Army left Bangladesh on 17 March. The force was trained and brought up by Major General Sujan Singh Uban from Research and Analysis Wing (RAW) as per the request of Sheikh Mujibur Rahman. Moidul Hassan, confirmed this information in the book Muktijuddher Purbapor.

He said, 

On the other hand, Brigadier General M. Shakhawat Hossain claimed that an Indian commander named Major Reddy was the all in all of the Savar camp. The post and the activity of that Indian is still a mystery to all who knew it. In Savar camp there was three additional battalions who were called Recruit Battalion. These three battalions were directly supervised by Major Bala Reddy. Anwar-ul-Alam admits that there were many Junior Commissioned Officers of Indian Army were in the training camp of Savar.

Formation 
On 3 January 1972, naming prime minister Tajuddin Ahmed as the chairman, the Bangladesh government announced the names of the ten members of the Central Regulating Board of the National Militia. The members were:
 Maulana Abdul Hamid Khan Bhashani (Chairman, Bhashani's National Awami Party)
 Abul Hasnat Muhammad Qamaruzzaman (Home Minister, People's Republic of Bangladesh)
 Manoranjan Dhar (Member of National Assembly, Awami League)
 Moni Singh (Chairman, Communist Party of Bangladesh)
 Professor Muzaffar Ahmed (President, Muzaffar's National Awami Party)
 Gazi Golam Mostafa (Member of Provincial Assembly, Awami League)
 Rafiq Uddin Bhuiyan (Member of Provincial Assembly, Awami League)
 Tofael Ahmed (Member of National Assembly, Awami League)
 Abdur Razzaq (Member of Provincial Assembly, Awami League)
 Captain (retd.) Muhammad Shujat Ali (Member of Provincial Assembly, Awami League).
Sheikh Mujibur Rahman, wanted to merge with the Jatiya Rakkhi Bahini, with the Bangladesh Rifles but the Bangladesh Rifles personnel stiffly opposed the move in a commotion that resulted in a mutiny. This plan was then abandoned.

The Jatiya Rakkhi Bahini Order (President’s order No. 21) of 1972 provided for the establishment of the force and set out its responsibilities and powers. The presidential order, published on 7 March, was retroactive to 1 February.

Political opponents of the Awami League allege that the Rakkhi Bahini was made to replace the army. The Rakkhi Bahini had automatic weapons, steel helmets, jeeps, trucks etc. The Awami League government seemed to be more interested in the development of the militia than in the armed forces. It was planned that this militia would be increased annually so that by the end of 1980 its strength would be 20 000. On the other hand, Bangladesh Army was poorly equipped. In winter they had to guard the border in slippers.

The Rakkhi Bahini was distrusted by the defence services in Bangladesh because of its pro-Indian orientation. This was so for several reasons. First, most of the members of the armed forces who fought during the War of Independence strongly believed that the Indian Army just walked in at the end of Bangladesh Liberation War thereby robbing the Bangladesh military of the "glory of liberating their motherland." Second, many senior military officers believed that the government-in-exile at Mujibnagar signed a secret treaty with the Indian government, compromising the sovereignty of Bangladesh and that Sheikh Mujib became less interested in the development of the defence forces because of that treaty. Third, many senior army personnel felt that the Jatiya Rakkhi Bahini was planned and designed by the Indian Army for the safety of the Awami League regime. The poorly-equipped defence services were also bitter about the fact that the Indian Army took away all the sophisticated weapons left by the Pakistan Army.

Mascarenhas also records the statement of Major General Abul Manzoor, that numerous military personnel were killed by Rakkhi Bahini terming them as Razakars or collaborators. Despite the indignation, from July 1973 to July 1974, the army conducted a number of combined military operations with the Rakkhi Bahini and the police such as checking for smuggling at the border, handling 'extremists', and maintaining law and order.

The Jatiya Rakkhi Bahini (Amendment) Act of 1974 added two new articles, 8A and 16A, to the act, effective retroactively to 1 February 1972. Article 8A granted officers of the Rakkhi Bahini the power to arrest without warrant any person they reasonably suspect of having committed a cognizable offence under any law. This is similar to the power of police officers. The article further states that anyone arrested by the Rakkhi Bahini shall be delivered forthwith to the nearest police station. It also gives officers the right of search and seizure in connection with any reasonable suspicion that an offence has been committed.

Article 3 of the act says,

According to these provisions anybody could be arrested by the Rakkhi Bahini at will mid they would remain immune from any judicial supervision in all their activities in which they would be pleased to indulge in "good faith".

This indemnity refrained the Judiciary Division from taking any legal actions

When Sheikh Mujibur Rahman was killed on 15 August 1975 by members of the Bangladesh Army, the Rakkhi Bahini was very inactive.

After the coup, members of Rakkhi Bahini who were deployed all around the country escaped from their camps and houses in fear of mob-violence, as the people were very angry on them.

After the death of Sheikh Mujibur Rahman, the force was absorbed in Bangladesh Army after the "Jatiyo Rokkhi Bahini Absorption Act, 1975 came into effect. It was issued on 9 October 1975 and was in effect from 3 September 1975.

The Director General of the force Brigadier Nuruzzaman was appointed as an ambassador after the force was absorbed.

Organization
Jatiya Rakkhi Bahini had a complete table of organization which was circulated on 8 March 1972 by a gazette notification. The chief of the force was known as Director General. His five deputies were known as Deputy Director General. In reality, the Rakkhi Bahini was under the direct control of the prime minister's office and attached to the local Awami League units. In time, the government planned to place each unit under the command of a district governor. The Rakkhi Bahini also swore an oath of loyalty to Sheikh Mujibur Rahman.

Brigadier A. N. M. Nuruzzaman was appointed as the Director General while Major Anwar Ul Alam Shahid (Deputy Director, Training), Lieutenant Colonel Abul Hasan Khan (Deputy Director, Administration), Lieutenant Colonel Sarwar (Deputy Director, Operations), Lieutenant Colonel Sabihuddin (Deputy Director, Signals), Lieutenant Colonel Azizul Islam (Deputy Director, Zonal Headquarters of Chittagong) and Lieutenant Colonel A M Khan (Deputy Director, Medical) were his six deputies. The bulk of the Rakkhi Bahini personnel were recruited from the Mujib Bahini, a militia force  that was formed during the concluding part of Liberation War and was under direct Indian supervision.

The basic training of the force officers candidates were given in Indian Military Academy, and at Savar camp, under the supervision of Indian military officer named Major Bala Reddy. Any other additional courses, special courses were also provided by Indian Army, at the Indian Military Academy of Dehradun.

Some additional land and properties were also given to this force by the government. The zonal headquarters building in the Bhatiary of Chittagong and lands in Giltala of Khulna, Bateshwar of Sylhet, Bogra and in Mirpur of Dhaka.

During its first days as it was formed as an auxiliary of Police, it helped police to guard the office. When police failed to control the situation, they were deployed. At least 44 offices and residents of police were attacked and looted from June to December 1973. So the government deployed Jatiyo Rakkhi Bahini within September of the year.

JASAD challenged the government's activities and started to gain huge popularity especially among the students and youths. And many other secret organizations emerged and gained popularity as the government was failing to solve almost every issue.

Human rights abuses 
The Rakkhi Bahini committed various human rights abuses, including extrajudicial killing, forced disappearances, shooting by death squads, and rape. Jatiyo Samajtantrik Dal claims that over 60,000 of its members were killed. The most conservative estimates put the death toll at over 2000. Syed Badrul Ahsan dismisses these claims as "myths."

Anthony Mascarenhas describes the activities of Jatiyo Rakkhi Bahini in his book Bangladesh: A Legacy of Blood, he writes:

The Jatiyo Rakkhi Bahini, which roughly translated means National Security Force, was an elite para-military force whose members had to take oaths of personal loyalty to Mujib. Despite its high-sounding name, it was a sort of private army of bully boys not far removed from Nazi Brown shirts.

Mascarenhas adds that by the end of 1973 the total of politically motivated murders in Bangladesh had crossed the 2000 mark. The victims included some members of Parliament and many of the murders were resulted of intra-party conflicts within Awami League.

Within three years, political killings by Jatiyo Rakkhi Bahini reached about 30,000. This included numerous Jatiyo Samajtantrik Dal members.

Even the capital Dhaka was not immune to the violence. An unofficial curfew was introduced after midnight. Almost every rickshaw, taxi and private car was checked and searched by Rokkhi Bahini personnel.

1974 famine

When the famine started, millions of people came to the capital from villages in search of food. The government decided to drive the poor and have-nots out of the capital as it was embarrassed in front of international community with the famine. On 3 January Jatiyo Rakkhi Bahini was deployed to 'Clean Dhaka' depriving the poor-beggars and the destitute from the city. In this operation about 0.2 million have-nots and slum dwellers were taken away from the capital and were forced either to return to their villages or to be moved to the three camps. The camps were hastily laid out several miles from the city. Condition of the camps was disastrous.

Amongst the three camps, the camp of Demra was the most appalling one, in where Jatiya Rakkhi Bahini gathered about 50,000 people. Those people were ill-treated and sometimes they felt that death is a better solution.

Al Mahmud did not listen to the government and tried to publish the accurate news. When the government came to know that, they sent three trucks full of Police and Jatiyo Rakkhi Bahini personnel to seize the office and press of 'Gonokontho' at night and arrested the Editor Al Mahmud along with seven workers of the press.

Jasad, frequently tortured by JRB, decided to hold a rally on 17 March at Paltan. They also made a plan to surround the resident of Home Minister Muhammad Mansur Ali on the same day after the rally.

On 17 March 1975, agitated Jasad supporters tried to set up a barricade in front of the resident of the Home Minister Muhammad Mansur Ali after the rally. But prepared JRB personnel started firing indiscriminately upon the crowd leaving several people dead on the spot.

A notable occurrence occurred on 17 March 1975. Jatiyo Rakkhi Bahini set up fire the headquarters of JASAD on 14 March 1975. JASAD decided to form a rally towards Home Minister Mansoor Ali's house and surround it as a counter to that incident on 17 March.

The rally that started from Paltan was forwarding to the Home Minister's house but the Jatiyo Rakkhi Bahini opened brush-fire and at least 50 JASAD activists were killed on the spot.

During the regime of Sheikh Mujibur Rahman thousands of youths were killed due to the suspicion of having connection with JASAD by Jatiyo Rakkhi Bahini.

Among them a leader of Bangladesh Krishok League central committee and a teacher of Nawabganj High School Siddiqur Rahman Khan was killed on 10 October 1972. On 17 September 1973 JASAD Student's League leader Bablu, Robi, Ebadat Ali, Motaleb, Kalu and many other were killed in daylight by Jatiyo Rakkhi Bahini.

Notable victims include: General Secretary of City College Students' Union Jahangir, student of Jahangir Nagar University Shah Borhan Uddin Rokon, student of BUET Nikhil Chandra Saha; Narshingdi JASAD leader Alauddin; JASAD leader from Gazipur Akram, Joinal, Shamsu, Badal, Anwar; Manikganj JASAD leader Shahadat Hossain Badal, Delwar Hossain Haraj, Abdul Awal Naju, Najim; activists from Jamalpur Giasuddin Master; JASAD activist Abdur Rashid, Hasu Miah; leader from Mymensingh Masuduzzaman, Abdul Jabbar; Madaripur JASAD activist Jahngir, Saddam, Ali Hosen, Mofijur; Faridpur's Kamaluzzaman, Abdul Hakim; Moniddin Ahmed, Salam Master, Rafique Uddin from Razshahi; Ata, Ranju, Manik Das Gupta, Tota, Colonel Rana, Khalil, Rajjak of Bagura; Natore's JASAD leader Nasiruddin; leader from Pabna Ashfaqur Rahman Kalu.

Execution of Siraj Sikder 
Siraj Sikder was a freedom fighter. He was educated in EPUET, now which is known as BUET. After the liberation war he started his mission to establish a socialist society. During the liberation war on 3 June he established the political party Purba Bangla Sharbahara Party. On the first congress of the party he was elected as the party's president on 14 January 1972. He started working as the President of the party. In 1973, he was elected as the President of an alliance of eleven peoples' organization named as Purba Banglar Jatyo Mukti Front (National Liberation Front of East Bengal). But analyzing political situation of the country which was named as "One Party Democracy" by Guardian and the increasing torture over his party members forced him to choose the way of revolution.

On 28 December 1974, the government announced the first ever state of emergency in the history of Bangladesh to arrest all the terrorists and opposition leaders. From then Sikder was being treated as an outlaw by the law and enforcement forces. He went underground after the promulgation of emergency. A Jatiyo Rakkhi Bahini commander later denied that the murder of Sikder was committed by his force.

Aruna Sen the wife of politician Shanti Sen, was detained by the Jatiya Rokkhi Bahini, along with her relative Chanchal Sen.  She was subjected to torture while in captivity. Aruna Sen published a statement regarding her captivity in the 17 March edition of Weekly Holiday and in the June edition of Monthly Sangskriti in 1974. After Aruna Sen was detained, a writ was filed at Supreme Court. The court asked Jatiyo Rakkhi Bahini to present her in front of the court and prove her detention legal. They presented her but failed to support the legality of the detention.

Shahjahan was an 18-year-old boy from what is now Naria Upazila of Faridpur District. He was arrested in Dhaka on 28 December 1973 and handed over to the Rakkhi Bahini at their request. He was not seen again after 2 January 1974, when his brother said he saw him in custody at Rakkhi Bahini headquarters. His brother petitioned the court for a writ of habeas corpus, challenging the legality of Shahjahan's detention. The Rakkhi Bahini responded that Shahjahan had escaped on 29 December, so was not in detention and could not be brought to the court. On cross examination, officers said the organization followed no regulations or procedure. They kept no records of their searches, seizures, arrests, or other activities. Former Prime Minister Moudud Ahmed believes that because Shahjahan allegedly belonged to the student wing of the Jatiyo Samajtantrik Dal,  an opposition political party, the Rakkhi Bahini killed him and secretly disposed of his body. Without evidence, however, the Rakkhi Bahini could not be held to account.

The court held that the Rakkhi Bahini version of events was "a pure concoction" that "demonstrates complete disregard of the law of the country." In May 1974, Justice Debesh Bhattacharya, condemned the organization in his verdict, stating:

The court urged the government to hold an enquiry into the whereabouts of Shahjahan, but none was ever undertaken.

Ayesha Faiz is the widow of Faizur Rahman and the mother of novelists Humayun Ahmed and Muhammad Zafar Iqbal. A house in Babar Road of Mohammadpur was allotted to her by the government for her husband. But just after three days she was kicked out of the house with her family by a Subedar Major of Jatiyo Rakkhi Bahini. She detailed the incident in her biography Jibon Je Rokom (Life as it is).

Ayesha Faiz left the home with her children. She later recalled: "Once I was made refugee by the Pakistan Army of occupation. The second time it was done by Sheikh Mujibur Rahman's Jatiyo Rakkhi Bahini.

Legacy

Human rights abuse
Human Rights Watch states that institutionalized violence committed by the Jatiya Rakkhi Bahini, established the culture of impunity and widespread prevalence of abuses by security forces in independent Bangladesh. Pro-Awami columnist Syed Badrul Ahsan defends its actions, but acknowledges "it would have been more effective and effectual, more properly indoctrinated in the spirit of the 1971 war, history would have been different."

In popular culture
 The Black Coat, a historical novel written by Neamat Imam and published by Penguin Books India in 2013, presents the most scathing criticism of Sheikh Mujib's rule and his employment of the Rakkhi Bahini in decades. The novel explores Sheikh Mujib's rule from 1972 to 1975, especially during the Bangladesh famine of 1974, when he became increasingly autocratic. Radio Canada commented that: The Black Coat is 'a novel that slays Sheikh Mujib,' and The Daily Star remarked: '...a poignant political tale... Imam has shown a lot of courage in dealing with one of the most tumultuous and controversial phases of independent Bangladesh's history.'

See also
 Kader Bahini
 Mujib Bahini
 Human rights in Bangladesh
 Freedom of religion in Bangladesh

References

External links 
 .
 .
 .
 .
 .

Sheikh Mujibur Rahman
Paramilitary forces of Bangladesh
History of Bangladesh (1971–present)
Bangladesh Awami League
Torture in Bangladesh